Rimapenaeus constrictus, common name roughneck shrimp, is a species of prawn found along the coast of the Atlantic Ocean. It has been recorded in coastal regions of Bermuda, Brazil, Canada and the United States.

References

Penaeidae
Crustaceans of the Atlantic Ocean
Crustaceans described in 1871